Khoshchobanly or Khoshchobanly or Khash-Chabanly may refer to:
Khoshchobanly, Salyan, Azerbaijan
Xoşçobanlı, Imishli, Azerbaijan 
Xoşçobanlı, Masally, Azerbaijan